Henry Allender (25 March 1872 – 25 April 1939) was an Australian rules footballer who played with Carlton in the Victorian Football League (VFL).

Allender played his only game for Carton in the first round of the 1899 VFL season against South Melbourne and was mentioned favourably in match reports, but was not selected in the next couple of matches and returned to Collingwood Juniors less than a month later.

Notes

External links 

Henry Allender's profile at Blueseum

1872 births
Australian rules footballers from Victoria (Australia)
Carlton Football Club players
1939 deaths